Marielund is a locality situated in Haparanda Municipality, Norrbotten County, Sweden with 1,726 inhabitants in 2010. It was built as a suburb to Haparanda in the 1970s and then got the name Mattila after a small village in the neighbourhood. To avoid confusion, the name was changed to the current one in the 1980s.

References 

Populated places in Haparanda Municipality
Norrbotten